Apolista is a native South American nation of western Bolivia. Sedentary farmers, hunters, gatherers and fishers, they spoke an Arawakan languages now gravely endangered, if not extinct. From 1713, they were gathered at a variety of missions with other nations, and rapidly lost their traditional culture to the point that a realistic census count is no longer possible.

Sources
This was taken from ‘Peoples, Nations and Cultures’ by Professor John Mackenzie

Anthropology
Ethnic groups in Bolivia